Edward George Biester Jr. (born January 5, 1931) is a retired Republican politician and judge who served as a member of the U.S. House of Representatives from Pennsylvania, from 1967 to 1977.

Biester graduated from George School in Newtown, Bucks County, Pennsylvania in 1948, Wesleyan University in 1952, and Temple University School of Law in 1955. He was Assistant District Attorney for Bucks County, Pennsylvania 1958 through 1964.

He was elected as a Republican to the 90th and to the four succeeding Congresses. He was not a candidate for reelection in 1976. In 1977, he was elected to the Common Cause National Governing Board. He was Attorney General of Pennsylvania from 1979 to 1980.

He served as a judge on the Bucks County Court of Common Pleas (7th Judicial District) from 1980 to 2006 and was senior judge from 2001 to 2006. He has been a member of the Office of Military Commissions in the Department of Defense since 2003.

In September 2004 he was appointed to the United States Court of Military Commission Review.

In April 2007, Biester joined JAMS, The Resolution Experts, as a full-time mediator and arbitrator at the JAMS Philadelphia Resolution Center at the Bell Atlantic Tower on Arch Street.

References

Sources

External links
 JAMS Website

1931 births
Living people
Pennsylvania Attorneys General
Judges of the Pennsylvania Courts of Common Pleas
People from Bucks County, Pennsylvania
Wesleyan University alumni
Temple University Beasley School of Law alumni
Guantanamo Bay captives legal and administrative procedures
Republican Party members of the United States House of Representatives from Pennsylvania
George School alumni
Judges of the United States Court of Military Commission Review